O. Chinnappa Reddy (1922-2013) was a judge at the Supreme Court of India. He is known for his pro-active judgements which changed the judicial history of India.

Life 
Chinnappa Reddy was born on 25 September 1922 at Gooty in a 5th generation Roman Catholic family in Anantapur district, Andhra Pradesh, India. He did his schooling at London Mission High School, Gooty and higher education at Loyola College and Madras Law College. He became permanent judge in 1967 at Andhra Pradesh High Court after he served as lawyer for two decades. He was elevated to Supreme Court in 1978 and retired in 1987. He died in 2013.

References 

Justices of the Supreme Court of India
1922 births
2013 deaths
Judges of the Andhra Pradesh High Court
20th-century Indian judges
People from Anantapur district